Pseudocaranx is a genus of ray-finned fishes from the family Carangidae, the jacks, trevallies, scads, and pompanos. They occur in the western Atlantic Ocean and the Indo-Pacific.

Species
Four recognized species are placed in this genus:
 Pseudocaranx chilensis (Guichenot, 1848) (Juan Fernandez trevally)
 Pseudocaranx dentex (Bloch & J. G. Schneider, 1801) (white trevally)
 Pseudocaranx dinjerra Smith-Vaniz & Jelks, 2006
 Pseudocaranx wrighti (Whitley, 1931) (skipjack trevally)

Fishbase does not treat Pseudocaranx georgianus as a valid species, treating it as a junior synonym of P. dentex, but notes that many other authorities treat it as a valid species. Catalog of Fishes and the IUCN Red List of Threatened Species treat it as a valid species.

References

 
Caranginae
Marine fish genera
Taxa named by Pieter Bleeker